Long Run is an unincorporated community in Doddridge County, West Virginia, United States. Its post office  is closed.

The community takes its name from nearby Long Run Creek.

References 

Unincorporated communities in West Virginia
Unincorporated communities in Doddridge County, West Virginia